Lennart Kurt Risberg (16 April 1935 – 4 September 2013) was a Swedish boxer. He competed in the lightweight event at the 1956 Summer Olympics, but was eliminated in the first round.

References

1935 births
2013 deaths
Olympic boxers of Sweden
Boxers at the 1956 Summer Olympics
Sportspeople from Stockholm
Swedish male boxers
Lightweight boxers
20th-century Swedish people